Batwanes Beek is an Egyptian music song, performed by Warda in the nineties, in Egypt. The music is composed by Salah El Sharnouby, and the lyrics is by Omar Batiesha.

In popular culture
In 2022, the Egyptian hit was used as an intro song of one of Moon Knight's episodes representing Cairo vibes.

In January 2023, during her performance in Dubai, American singer Beyoncé sampled "Batwanes Beek" for a musical interlude.

References 

Egyptian songs
1992 songs